Norfolk is a town in Litchfield County, Connecticut, United States. The population was 1,588 at the 2020 census. The urban center of the town is the Norfolk census-designated place, with a population of 553 at the 2010 census.

Norfolk is perhaps best known as the site of the Yale Summer School of Music—Norfolk Chamber Music Festival, which hosts an annual chamber music concert series in "the Music Shed", a performance hall located on the Ellen Battell Stoeckel estate to the west of the village green. Norfolk has important examples of regional architecture, notably the Village Hall (now Infinity Hall, a shingled 1880s Arts-and-Crafts confection, with an opera house upstairs and storefronts at street level); the Norfolk Library (a shingle-style structure, designed by George Keller, /1889); and over thirty buildings, in a wide variety of styles, designed by Alfredo S. G. Taylor (of the New York firm Taylor & Levi) in the four decades before the Second World War.

History

Norfolk incorporated as a town in 1758. The town was named after Norfolk in England.

The Norfolk Historic District includes the historic center of the village of Norfolk.

Geography
The town is located in the Litchfield Hills portion of the Appalachian mountain range.

The town is bordered on the west by Canaan and North Canaan, Connecticut; on the north by New Marlborough and Sandisfield, Massachusetts; on the east by Colebrook and Winchester, Connecticut; and on the south by Goshen, Connecticut.

Principal communities
Norfolk Center
North Norfolk
South Norfolk
West Norfolk

State parks
Norfolk is home to three state parks: Dennis Hill State Park, which includes the remnants of a lavish summer pavilion designed by Alfredo Taylor; Haystack Mountain State Park, with a stone tower at the mountain's summit; and Campbell Falls State Park Reserve, with an approximately  natural waterfall.

Demographics

As of the census of 2000, there were 1,660 people, 676 households, and 461 families residing in the town. There were 871 housing units at an average density of 19.2 per square mile (7.4/km). The racial makeup of the town was 97.11% White, 0.48% African American, 0.24% Native American, 0.54% Asian, 0.60% from other races, and 1.02% from two or more races. Hispanic or Latino of any race were 0.96% of the population.

There were 676 households, out of which 28.0% had children under the age of 18 living with them, 58.3% were married couples living together, 6.5% had a female householder with no husband present, and 31.7% were non-families. 24.6% of all households were made up of individuals, and 10.4% had someone living alone who was 65 years of age or older. The average household size was 2.44 and the average family size was 2.92.

In the town, the population was spread out, with 23.7% under the age of 18, 4.3% from 18 to 24, 29.2% from 25 to 44, 29.0% from 45 to 64, and 13.8% who were 65 years of age or older. The median age was 41 years. For every 100 females, there were 96.4 males. For every 100 females age 18 and over, there were 97.0 males.

The median income for a household in the town was $58,906, and the median income for a family was $67,500. Males had a median income of $41,654 versus $36,442 for females. The per capita income for the town was $34,020. About 1.8% of families and 4.1% of the population were below the poverty line, including 4.3% of those under age 18 and 6.2% of those age 65 or over.

Education

Norfolk is a member of Regional School District 7, which also includes, Barkhamsted, Colebrook, and New Hartford. Public school students attend Botelle Elementary School for grades K–6, Northwestern Middle School for grades 7–8, and Northwestern Regional High School for grades 9–12.

Transportation
The main thoroughfares of the town are U.S. Route 44 (going east–west, also known as Greenwoods Road) and Connecticut Route 272 (going north–south, with 272N also known as North Street and 272S also known as Litchfield Road). US 44 leads west  to North Canaan and southeast  to Winsted, while CT 272 leads south  to Torrington.

Notable locations

Blackberry River Inn, built in 1763 and listed on the National Register of Historic Places
Gould House, listed on the National Register of Historic Places
Haystack Mountain Tower, built in 1929 and listed on the National Register of Historic Places in 1993
Hillside, listed on the National Register of Historic Places
Infinity Hall, an 1883 opera house and concert hall
Low House, listed on the National Register of Historic Places
Norfolk Library, built in 1888–89, a contributing property in Norfolk Historic District
Rectory and Church of the Immaculate Conception, built in 1924 and added to the National Register of Historic Places in 1982
Rockwell House, listed on the National Register of Historic Places
Tom Thumb House, listed on the National Register of Historic Places
World War I Memorial, listed on the National Register of Historic Places

Notable people, past and present

Notable residents have included: 
 Hayden Carruth (1921–2008), published a book of "Norfolk Poems" in 1962
 Joseph Emerson (1821-1900), minister and theologian
 Anne Garrels (1951-2022), NPR foreign correspondent
 Brendan Gill (1914–1997), critic and writer for The New Yorker magazine
 James Laughlin (1914–1997), publisher
 Marie Hartig Kendall (1854–1943), photographer
 Barbara Spofford Morgan (1887–1971), educator, essayist on religion and a specialist in mental testing
 Michael I. Pupin (1858–1935), inventor
 Laura M. Hawley Thurston (1812–1842), poet, teacher
 William Henry Welch (1850–1934), founding dean of the Johns Hopkins University School of Medicine
 William Windom (1827–1891), US senator and United States Secretary of the Treasury

Nearby Attractions

 Haystack Mountain State Park, a public recreation area with hiking trails and a 1,716-foot-high mountain topped with an observation tower
 Campbell Falls State Park, an undeveloped, public recreation area and nature preserve
 Infinity Hall, an American performing arts venue
 Husky Meadows Farm, an organic farm offering CSA (Community-supported agriculture) subscriptions and culinary farm stays
 Norfolk Chamber Music Festival, believed to be the oldest active summer music festival in North America and now managed by the Yale University School of Music

Climate

This climatic region is typified by large seasonal temperature differences, with warm to hot (and often humid) summers and cold (sometimes severely cold) winters. On February 16, 1943, the temperature fell to −37 °F (−38 °C), the lowest temperature ever recorded in Connecticut. According to the Köppen Climate Classification system, Norfolk has a humid continental climate, abbreviated "Dfb" on climate maps.

References

A. Havemeyer & R. Dance, Alfredo Taylor in Norfolk (Norfolk: Norfolk Hist. Soc., 2005)
A. Havemeyer & R. Dance, The Magnificent Battells (Norfolk: Norfolk Hist. Soc., 2006)
T.W. Crissey, History of Norfolk, Litchfield County, Connecticut (Everett, MA: Massachusetts Pub. Co., 1900)
A.V. Waldecker [ed.], Norfolk, Connecticut 1900–1975 (Norfolk: Norfolk Bicen. Comm., 1976)

External links

 Official town website
 Norfolk Library
 Norfolk Historical Society
 Description of Norfolk 

 
Towns in Litchfield County, Connecticut
Populated places established in 1744
Towns in the New York metropolitan area
Towns in Connecticut
1744 establishments in the Thirteen Colonies